Eric Javier Alejandro (born April 15, 1986) is an athlete representing Puerto Rico and competing mostly in the 400 meters hurdles. He was born in Burlington, New Jersey, United States. An alumnus of Eastern Michigan University, he represented Puerto Rico in the men's 400 meters hurdles in the 2012 Summer Olympics.

Personal bests

Outdoor
 400 m: 47.75 s –  Tampa, Florida, 14 March 2014
 110 m hurdles: 14.13 s (wind: 0.0 m/s) –  Oxford, Ohio, 12 May 2007
 400 m hurdles: 49.07 s –  São Paulo, 2 August 2014

Indoor
 60 m: 6.99 s –  Ypsilanti, Michigan, 12 January 2008
 200 m: 22.21 s –  Ann Arbor, Michigan, 17 February 2007
 400 m: 47.56 s –  Allendale, Michigan, 21 February 2014
 60 m hurdles: 7.41 s –  Ypsilanti, Michigan, 1 March 2008

Competition record

References
General
 
 
Specific

External links
 Tilastopaja biography

Eastern Michigan Eagles men's track and field athletes
1986 births
Living people
Olympic track and field athletes of Puerto Rico
Athletes (track and field) at the 2012 Summer Olympics
Athletes (track and field) at the 2016 Summer Olympics
People from Burlington, New Jersey
Sportspeople from Burlington County, New Jersey
Track and field athletes from New Jersey
Puerto Rican male hurdlers
Pan American Games competitors for Puerto Rico
Athletes (track and field) at the 2011 Pan American Games
Athletes (track and field) at the 2015 Pan American Games
World Athletics Championships athletes for Puerto Rico
Central American and Caribbean Games silver medalists for Puerto Rico
Competitors at the 2014 Central American and Caribbean Games
Central American and Caribbean Games medalists in athletics